The 2002 AIHL season was the third season of the Australian Ice Hockey League (AIHL). The Sydney Bears completed the double by winning the league premiership by finishing top of the league standings and claiming the Goodall Cup after defeating Adelaide Avalanche in the AIHL final.

League business
The 2002 season saw the league expand from three teams to six with the introduction of the Melbourne Ice, Newcastle North Stars, and the West Sydney Ice Dogs. The league also secured the Goodall Cup as the trophy for the AIHL final victor for the first time (winners in 2000 and 2001 were backdated).

Regular season

Source

Goodall Cup playoffs
The playoffs were held at Sydney's Blacktown Ice Arena. The Sydney Bears defeated the Adelaide Avalanche in the final to win the Goodall Cup. The Bears were the first team to win the Goodall Cup in the AIHL after it was transferred from the inter-state tournament.

Statistics

Scoring leaders
List shows the ten top skaters sorted by points, then goals.

Leading goaltenders
Only the top five goaltenders, based on save percentage.

References

External links
Australian Ice Hockey League

AIHL season
AIHL season
Australian Ice Hockey League seasons